Kenneth Walker III (born April 1, 1994) is an American football wide receiver. He played college football for the UCLA Bruins from 2012 to 2016. He was also a sprinter on the UCLA track and field team. Walker played for the Winnipeg Blue Bombers of the Canadian Football League (CFL) in 2019 and for the Pittsburgh Maulers of the United States Football League (USFL) in 2022.

Early years
Walker was born in Stockton, California, to Patricia Jones and Kenneth Walker II. He grew in the East Bay in the dangerous Iron Triangle neighborhood of Richmond.  His parents separated when he was in the seventh grade, and his mom raised Walker and his two older brothers as a single parent. In an attempt to keep her youngest out of trouble, she sent him to live in Oakley with his father, who had remarried. There, Walker excelled in both track and football at Freedom High School.

After Walker's sophomore year, his father divorced, and they moved back to Richmond with his mother. At Richmond's John F. Kennedy High School, he won three Junior Olympics titles in the hurdles and became an excellent student and a top-rated high school football player. He received playing time in high school as a running back, receiver, punter, kick returner and quarterback.

According to ESPN, Walker received more than 12 scholarship offers to play college football. He orally committed in August 2011 to the University of California, Berkeley. However, he began to reconsider after Cal receivers coach Eric Kiesau left the school. In February 2012, Walker switched his commitment to the University of California, Los Angeles.

College athletics
Walker enrolled at UCLA in 2012 and played at the wide receiver position for the Bruins football team. He appeared in 12 games as a true freshman in 2012, missed the 2013 season with a back injury, and appeared in nine games in 2014, 13 games in 2015, and 11 games in 2016. He started nine games for UCLA in 2015 and seven in 2016. Walker had two 100-yard receiving games during the 2016 season: 115 yards and a touchdown on six receptions against Texas A&M on September 3; and 114 yards and two touchdowns on two receptions against Arizona on October 1.

Walker also competed as a sprinter for the UCLA track team.

Professional career

Jacksonville Jaguars 
Walker was signed by the Jacksonville Jaguars as an undrafted free agent following the 2017 NFL Draft. He was waived on August 14, 2017.

Arizona Hotshots 
In 2018, Walker signed with the Arizona Hotshots for the inaugural 2019 season of the Alliance of American Football (AAF), but was waived in January 2019 as part of the final roster cuts before the season opener.

Winnipeg Blue Bombers 
Walker signed with the Winnipeg Blue Bombers of the Canadian Football League (CFL) on March 18, 2019. He was released during final roster cuts on June 9, but was re-signed to the team's practice roster the same day. Walker was promoted to the active roster on July 18 to replace injured kick returner Charles Nelson. In his first CFL game in Week 6, he returned nine punts for 97 yards and one kickoff for 26 against the Ottawa Redblacks. In the following week versus the Hamilton Tiger-Cats, Walker fumbled one punt return and had another fumble overturned on a penalty. He also received playing time at receiver after in-game injuries to their corps. After his off game, he was replaced in the lineup by Janarion Grant. The Blue Bombers won the 107th Grey Cup against Hamilton with Walker on the practice roster.

Pittsburgh Maulers 
Walker signed with the Pittsburgh Maulers of the United States Football League (USFL) on May 6, 2022. He was released four days later.

References

1994 births
Living people
Sportspeople from Richmond, California
Players of American football from California
African-American players of American football
American football wide receivers
UCLA Bruins football players
Jacksonville Jaguars players
Arizona Hotshots players
African-American players of Canadian football
American players of Canadian football
Canadian football wide receivers
Canadian football return specialists
Winnipeg Blue Bombers players
American male sprinters
Track and field athletes from California
UCLA Bruins men's track and field athletes
Pittsburgh Maulers (2022) players